tropical mabuya may refer to:

 Trachylepis paucisquamis 
 Trachylepis polytropis

See also
Skink

Animal common name disambiguation pages